Turridae is a taxonomic family name for a number of predatory sea snails, marine gastropod mollusks in the superfamily Conoidea.

The family name Turridae was originally given to a very large group of several thousand sea snail species that were thought to be closely related. The family was described with about 700 genus-group taxa and an estimated 10,000 recent and fossil species.  However, that original grouping was discovered to be polyphyletic.

In recent years, the family Turridae has been much reduced in size, because a number of other families were created to contain the monophyletic lineages that had previously been thought to belong in the same family.

The common name turrids is still used informally to refer to the polyphyletic group.

Distribution 
Species in the family Turridae are found worldwide; most are found in the neritic zone. It is a major component of the Indo-Pacific molluscan fauna.

Shell description
The shape of the narrow shells is more or less fusiform. The whorls are elongate to broadly spindle-shaped and conical. The shells are generally small, their length usually smaller than 15 mm (with a few exceptions, up to 25 mm). The sculpture is variable. The shell shows strong ribs and spiral ridges.The aperture is long and narrow, with a siphonal canal and an anal sinus. 

Turrids are carnivorous, predatory gastropods. Most species have a poison gland used with the toxoglossan radula, used to prey on vertebrates and invertebrate animals (mostly polychaete worms)  or in self-defense. Some turrids have lost the radula and the poison gland. The radula, when present, has two or three teeth in a row. It lacks lateral teeth and the marginal teeth are of the wishbone or duplex type. The teeth with a duplex form are not shaped from two distinct elements but grow from a flat plate, by thickening at the edges of the teeth and elevation of the rear edge from the membrane.

Female turrids lay their eggs in lens-shaped capsules.

History of the taxonomy 
The family Turridae, in the older broadest sense of the group, was in the past perceived as one of the most difficult groups to study because of a large number of supra-specific described taxa, which were complicated by their species diversity. 

This led to an outcry by Melvill & Standen in 1901:

Although some species were relatively common, many were rare, some being known only from single specimens; this is another factor that made studying the group difficult. Turridiae was in this sense a heterogenous family that contained, more or less, all conoideans not included in the Conidae and Terebridae. Most of this was based on radula and shell characters. Taylor et al. (1993) tried to rely more on anatomical characters and moved several subfamilies from Turridae to Conidae.

2005 taxonomy
According to the taxonomy of the Gastropoda by Bouchet & Rocroi, 2005, which attempted to set out a stable taxonomy, this family consisted of the following five subfamilies:
 Turrinae H. Adams & A. Adams, 1853 (1838) - synonyms: Pleurotominae Gray, 1838; Lophiotominae Morrison, 1965 (n.a.)
 Cochlespirinae Powell, 1942
 Crassispirinae McLean, 1971 - synonym: Belinae A. Bellardi, 1875
 Zemaciinae Sysoev, 2003
 Zonulispirinae McLean, 1971 

2011 taxonomy
The 2005 classification system for the group was greatly changed by the 2011 publication of an article revising the taxonomy of the superfamily Conoidea,  Bouchet P., Kantor Yu.I., Sysoev A. & Puillandre N. (2011) A new operational classification of the Conoidea. Journal of Molluscan Studies 77: 273-308. The authors presented a new classification of the superfamily Conoidea on the genus level, based on anatomical characters but also on the molecular phylogeny as presented by Puillandre N., et al., 2008. The polyphyletic family Turridae was resolved into 13 monophyletic families (containing 358 currently recognized genera and subgenera)
 Conorbidae
 Borsoniidae
 Clathurellidae
 Mitromorphidae
 Mangeliidae
 Raphitomidae
 Cochlespiridae
 Drilliidae
 Pseudomelatomidae (= Crassispiridae)
 Clavatulidae
 Horaiclavidae
 Turridae s.s.
 Strictispiridae - synonym of Pseudomelatomidae Morrison, 1966

Current genera
Genera in the family Turridae sensu stricto, include according to WoRMS:

 † Coronia de Gregorio, 1890 
 † Coroniopsis MacNeil, 1984 
 Cryptogemma Dall, 1918
 † Daphnobela Cossmann, 1896
 Decollidrillia Habe & Ito, 1965
 † Eopleurotoma Cossmann, 1889 
 † Epalxis Cossmann, 1889  
 Epidirella Iredale, 1913
 Gemmula Weinkauff, 1875
 Gemmuloborsonia Shuto, 1989
 † Gemmulopsis Tracey & Craig, 2019 †
 † Ingaunoturricula M. P. Bernasconi & Robba, 1984 
 Iotyrris Medinskaya & Sysoev, 2001
 Kuroshioturris Shuto, 1961
 Lophiotoma Casey, 1904
 Lucerapex Iredale, 1936
 † Optoturris A.W.B. Powell, 1944
 † Oxyacrum Cossmann, 1889 
 † Pleuroliria De Gregorio, 1890
 Polystira Woodring, 1928
 Purpuraturris K. Chase, Watkins, Safavi-Hemami & B. M. Olivera, 2022
 Turridrupa Hedley, 1922
 Turris Röding, 1798 - type genus
 Unedogemmula MacNeil, 1961
 Xenuroturris Iredale, 1929

Synonymy
 Annulaturris Powell, 1966: synonym of Turris  Batsch, 1789
 Austrogemmula Laseron, 1954: synonym of Epidirella  Iredale, 1913
 Bathybermudia Haas, 1949: synonym of  Ptychosyrinx  Thiele, 1925
 Clamturris Iredale, 1931: synonym of  Xenuroturris  Iredale, 1929
 Eugemmula Iredale, 1931: synonym of  Gemmula  Weinkauff, 1875
 Euryentmena : synonym of  Euryentmema Woodring, 1928 (misspelling)
 Lophioturris Powell, 1964: synonym of  Lophiotoma  Casey, 1904
 Oxytropa Glibert, 1955: synonym of  Polystira  Woodring, 1928
 Pinguigemmula McNeil, 1961: synonym of Cryptogemma Dall, 1918
 Pleurotoma Lamarck, 1799: synonym of  Turris  Batsch, 1789
 Ptychosyrinx Thiele, 1925: synonym of Cryptogemma Dall, 1918

Subfamily Strictispirinae McLean, 1971 : synonym of Strictispiridae McLean, 1971, synonym of Pseudomelatomidae Morrison, 1966 (raised to family level)

References

Further reading 
 Grant, U. S. & H. R. Gale, 1931 [3 November], Catalogue of the marine Pliocene and Pleistocene Mollusca of California and adjacent regions; with notes on their morphology, classification, and nomenclature and a special treatment of the Pectinidae and the Turridae (including a few Miocene and Recent species), together with a summary of the stratigraphic relations of the formations involved. Memoirs of the San Diego Society of Natural History, 1: 1036 pp., 32 pls.
 Powell, A. W. B., 1942 [15 July], The New Zealand Recent and fossil Mollusca of the family Turridae with general notes on turrid nomenclature and systematics. Bulletin of the Auckland Institute and Museum, 2: 188 pp., 14 pls.
 Powell A. W. B. (1964). "The family Turridae in the Indo-Pacific. Part 1, The subfamily Turrinae". Indo-Pacific Mollusca 1: 227–345.
 Morrison, J. P. E., 1966 [28 February], On the families of Turridae. The American Malacological Union. Annual Reports, for 1965: 1–2
 Oyama, K., 1966, On living Japanese Turridae. Venus, 25(1): 1–20
 Powell, A. W. B., 1966, The molluscan families Speightiidae and Turridae, an evaluation of the valid taxa, both Recent and fossil, with list of characteristic species. Bulletin of the Auckland Institute and Museum, 5: 184 pp., 23 pls.
 Powell, A. W. B., 1969 [9 September], The family Turridae in the Indo-Pacific. Part 2. The subfamily Turriculinae. Indo-Pacific Mollusca, 2(10): 207–415, pls. 188–324
 Sabelli, B. & G. Spada, 1977, Guida illustrata all'identificazione delle conchiglie del Mediterraneo. Fam. Turridae I. Conchiglie, 13(3–4[Supplemento]): 2 pp., 1 pl.
 Kilburn R. N. (1983). "Turridae (Mollusca: Gastropoda) of southern Africa and Mozambique. Part 1. Subfamily Turrinae." Ann. Natal. Mus. 25: 549–585.
 McLean J. (1971). "A revised classification of the family Turridae, with the proposal of new subfamilies, genera, and subgenera from the Eastern Pacific". Veliger 14: 114–130
 Vera Peláez, J. L., J. Martinell & M. C. Lozano-Francisco, 1999 [June], Turridae (Gastropoda, Prosobranchia) of the Lower Pliocene from Malaga (Spain). Iberus, 17(1): 1–1
 Vera peláez, J. L., 2002 [29 November], Revision de la familia Turridae, excepto Clavatulinae (Gastropoda, Prosobranchia) en el Plioceno de las cuencas de Estepona, Malaga y Velez Malaga (Malaga, S Espana) con la descripcion de 26 especies nuevas. Pliocenica, 2: 176–262
  Tucker, J.K. 2004 Catalog of recent and fossil turrids (Mollusca: Gastropoda). Zootaxa 682:1-1295*
  Kilburn, Richard N., Alexander E. Fedosov, and Baldomero M. Olivera. "Revision of the genus Turris (Gastropoda: Conoidea: Turridae) with the description of six new species." Zootaxa 3244.1 (2012): 1

External links 
  W.H. Dall (1918) Notes on the nomenclature of the mollusks of the family Turritidae; Proceedings of the United States National Museum v. 54 (1918)
  (older) Turrid Classification
  Tucker, J.K. 2004 Catalog of recent and fossil turrids (Mollusca: Gastropoda). Zootaxa 682:1-1295.
 Sealifebase: Species mentioned in Tucker, J.K. 2004 Catalog of recent and fossil turrids (Mollusca: Gastropoda). Zootaxa 682:1-1295
 Miocene Gastropods and Biostratigraphy of the Kern River Area, California; United States Geological Survey Professional Paper 642 
 Worldwide Mollusc Species Data Base: Turridae

 
Gastropod families